The canton of Modane is an administrative division of the Savoie department, southeastern France. Its borders were modified at the French canton reorganisation which came into effect in March 2015. Its seat is in Modane.

It consists of the following communes:

Aussois 
Avrieux
Bessans
Bonneval-sur-Arc
Fourneaux
Freney
Modane
Orelle
Saint-André
Saint-Martin-d'Arc
Saint-Martin-de-la-Porte
Saint-Michel-de-Maurienne
Val-Cenis
Valloire
Valmeinier
Villarodin-Bourget

References

Cantons of Savoie